Michel Billout (born 19 February 1958) is a former member of the Senate of France, representing the Seine-et-Marne department. He is a member of the Communist, Republican, and Citizen Group.

External links
Page on the Senate website 

1958 births
Living people
French Senators of the Fifth Republic
Place of birth missing (living people)
Senators of Seine-et-Marne
21st-century French politicians